The Paymaster's Son is a surviving 1913 silent short drama film directed by Francis Ford and produced by Thomas H. Ince.

Cast
Robert Edeson - John Burton, The Paymaster's Son
Charles K. French - Silas Burton, The Paymaster
Robert Stanton - Colonel Randall
Ann Little - Ethel Burton, The Paymaster's Daughter (*Anna Little)
J. Barney Sherry - Richard Randall, Colonel's son
Jane Grey - 
Nick Cogley - 
Charles Edler -

References

External links

1913 films
American silent short films
Films directed by Francis Ford
Silent American drama films
1913 drama films
American black-and-white films
1913 short films
1910s American films